Patriarch Cyril IV may refer to:

 Patriarch Cyril IV of Constantinople, patriarch in 1711–1713
 Pope Cyril IV of Alexandria, Pope of Alexandria & Patriarch of the See of St. Mark in 1854–1861